The Quick Fix may refer to:
 "The Quick Fix" (The Shield), the 1st episode of Season 2 (2003) in The Shield
 The Quick Fix (novel), 2013 juvenile novel by Jack D. Ferraiolo